Banalités (from ban) were, until the 18th century, restrictions in feudal tenure in France by an obligation to have peasants use the facilities of their lords. These included the required use-for-payment of the lord's mill to grind grain, his wine press to make wine, and his oven to bake bread. Both the manorial lord's right to these dues and the banality-dues themselves are called droit de banalité. The object of this right was qualified as banal, e.g. the four banal or taureau banal.

The peasants could also be subjected to the banalité de tor et ver, meaning that only the lord had the right to own a bull or a boar. The deliberate mating of cattle or pigs incurred fines. The lord of the manor could also require a certain number of days each year of the peasants' forced labor. This practice of forced labor was called the corvée.

In New France, the only banality was the mandatory use of the lord's mill. 

Similar laws, especially pertaining to mills, were common in medieval Europe and continued after the medieval period in many places (e.g., banrecht in the Netherlands, Ehaft in Germany). Free peasants and tenant farmers were obligated to take their grain to the manorial lord's mill. In England, feudal duty obligated many peasants to use bannal mills and ovens. In Scotland, thirlage tied land to a particular mill, whose owner took a proportion of the grain as multure.

In France these monopolistic rights were abolished on the night of the 4th of August 1789 but feudal lords continued to be reimbursed until 1793.

Sources
 Eugène Bonnemère, Histoire des paysans, depuis la fin du moyen âge, BNF.
 Banal Rights - The Quebec History Encyclopedia

Notes

See also
 Causes of the French Revolution

Feudalism in France